Kenneth "Ken" Batty (born ) is a former rugby union and professional rugby league footballer who played in the 1960s and 1970s.

Playing career

Championship final appearances
Ken Batty played , i.e. number 5, in Wakefield Trinity's 17-10 victory over Hull Kingston Rovers in the Championship Final during the 1967-68 season at Headingley Rugby Stadium, Leeds on Saturday 4 May 1968.

Challenge Cup Final appearances
Ken Batty played , i.e. number 5, in Wakefield Trinity's 10-11 defeat by Leeds in the 1968 Challenge Cup "Watersplash" Final during the 1967–68 season at Wembley Stadium, London on Saturday 11 May 1968, in front of a crowd of 87,100.

NRL Grand Final appearances
Ken Batty played , i.e. number 2, in St. George Dragons' 10-16 defeat by South Sydney Rabbitohs in the NRL Grand Final Final during the 1971 NSWRFL season at Sydney Cricket Ground on Saturday 18 September 1971.

References

External links
Rugby Cup Final 1968

Living people
English rugby league players
Place of birth missing (living people)
Rugby league centres
Rugby league five-eighths
Rugby league players from Yorkshire
Rugby league wingers
English rugby union players
St. George Dragons players
Wakefield Trinity players
Year of birth missing (living people)